David Robert Pack (born July 15, 1952) is an American singer and musician who co-founded the rock band Ambrosia in the 1970s.

Career

As performer
Pack was co-founder, guitarist and main vocalist for the band Ambrosia. His collected works as a performer and producer have sold over forty million units worldwide. Hits from the band written and sung by Pack include certified gold singles "Biggest Part of Me" (1980), "You're the Only Woman (You & I)" (1980) and "How Much I Feel" (1978). He co-wrote and sang lead on the band's first top 20 hit, "Holdin' on to Yesterday" (1975). His 2005 solo album, The Secret of Movin' On, included remakes of "Biggest Part of Me" and "You're the Only Woman".

Pack guested on lead vocals on the song "Ground Zero" for Kerry Livgren's 1980 solo album, Seeds of Change. He then performed on Kansas' Vinyl Confessions album in 1982. He would later contribute guest lead vocals on the track "Shine On" off of the album It's a Jungle Out There! by Mastedon, one of two Mastedon albums written and produced by former Kansas lead singer John Elefante and his brother Dino Elefante.

During the 1980s, Pack enjoyed moderate success as a solo artist with the release of his Anywhere You Go LP in 1985.  The album generated three charting singles, the greatest of which was "I Just Can't Let Go" (US AC #13), a collaboration with Michael McDonald and James Ingram. In 1988, he recorded a duet with Bette Midler titled "I Know You by Heart", which was featured in the film Beaches and on its soundtrack.

He co-wrote three songs ("The Three of Me", "I'm Talkin' to You" and "Oh, Life (There Must Be More)"), for which he also sang and played guitar, on Alan Parsons's 1993 album Try Anything Once, and sang and played guitar on the song "You Can Run" on Parsons' 2004 album, A Valid Path. (Ambrosia's first album was engineered by Alan Parsons, who served as producer and engineer for their second; all four members of Ambrosia played on the first Alan Parsons Project album, Tales of Mystery and Imagination.) Pack joined producer Alan Parsons on his 2001 live tribute tour to the music of the Beatles called A Walk Down Abbey Road.

Pack again appeared as lead vocalist on the song "I Won't Be Led Astray" on Parsons' 2022 album From the New World.

As producer
Pack has worked as producer for Phil Collins, Aretha Franklin, Kenny Loggins, and Wynonna Judd. He has also produced music for Chet Atkins, Patti Austin, David Benoit, Natalie Cole, Chick Corea, Andrae Crouch, DC Talk, Amy Grant, Faith Hill, Bruce Hornsby, Jennifer Hudson, James Ingram, Patti LaBelle, Little Richard, Branford Marsalis, Bette Midler, Michael McDonald, Brian McKnight, Olivia Newton-John, The Pointer Sisters, LeAnn Rimes, Linda Ronstadt, Brian Setzer, Mavis Staples, Take 6, Steve Vai, Trisha Yearwood, and CeCe Winans.

Pack produced the 1995 album The Songs of West Side Story, which benefited the school. The album is notable for being the final recorded performance of Selena, made three weeks before her murder in March 1995, and for containing the final work by Marty Paich, who arranged the strings on Franklin's "Somewhere".

He served as producer and music director for President Bill Clinton's inaugurations in January 1993 and 1997. 
In 1997, the White House asked him to direct the music and produce the presidents' Volunteer Summit in Philadelphia for presidents Clinton, Bush, Carter and Ford. In 2000, he was asked to direct and produce Yamaha's Michael McDonald Lifetime Achievement Award Show at the L.A. Shrine for his good friend. Pack brought together Ray Charles, Patti LaBelle, Kenny Loggins, Boz Scaggs and Christopher Cross for the event. In 2005, he produced and directed the 2005 World Aids Day Concert at Saddleback Church in Orange County for author and pastor Rick Warren.

Discography

Solo albums
 Anywhere You Go (1985)
 Unborn (2004)
 The Secret of Movin' On (2005)
 David Pack's Napa Crossroads (2014)

Solo singles
 "That Girl Is Gone" (1985) (US AC #16, Canada #93)
 "Prove Me Wrong" (1986) (US #95)
 "I Just Can't Let Go" (1986) (US AC #13)

Albums with Ambrosia

Compilation Albums with Ambrosia

Singles with Ambrosia

Other projects 
 Symbols of Tyme
 Beato Band

References

External links
David Pack's official site

1952 births
Living people
Ambrosia (band) members
American Christians
American rock singers
American rock guitarists
American male guitarists
American soft rock musicians
Bruce Hornsby and the Range members
Guitarists from Los Angeles
20th-century American guitarists
Warner Records artists